The 2019 Wong Tai Sin District Council election was held on 24 November 2019 to elect all 25 members to the District Council. 

The pro-democrats scored a historic landslide victory in the election amid the massive pro-democracy protests by taking all the seats in the council. The pro-Beijing councillors were completely wiped out as a result, with Democratic Party becoming the largest party.

Overall election results
Before election:

Change in composition:

References

External links
 Election Results - Overall Results

2019 Hong Kong local elections